Father of 4 is the debut solo studio album by American rapper Offset. It was released on February 22, 2019, by Motown and Quality Control Music. The album's release makes Offset the third and final member from Migos to release a solo album. It features guest appearances by J. Cole, Cardi B, Travis Scott, 21 Savage, Big Rube, Gunna, CeeLo Green, Quavo, and Gucci Mane. The album was supported by two singles: "Red Room" and "Clout".

Father of 4 received generally positive reviews from critics and debuted at number four on the US Billboard 200. It is Offset's second solo US top 10 album.

Background
The idea of a solo album by Offset was initially revealed shortly after the release of Quavo Huncho and The Last Rocket, both by fellow Migos artists Quavo and Takeoff respectively, and was slated for a December 14, 2018 release date. The album was delayed presumably due to complications between his relationship with his wife Cardi B, on February 10, 2019, the album was given a new release date of February 22. In early 2019, Offset announced a documentary teaser to release alongside the album which shows a scene where his wife and rapper Cardi B gives birth to their daughter, Kulture. On February 18, Offset tweeted that Metro Boomin and Southside were going to be sole producers of his album.

Promotion
The album's lead single, "Red Room", was released on February 14, 2019, but was previously made available for a short time on November 30, 2018, before later being taken down. The song was produced by Metro Boomin. The album's second single, "Clout" featuring his wife Cardi B, was released on March 15, 2019.

Critical reception

Father of 4 was met with generally positive reviews. At Metacritic, which assigns a normalized rating out of 100 to reviews from mainstream publications, the album received an average score of 72, based on eight reviews.

Trent Clark of HipHopDX gave a positive review, stating "The 27-year-old Offset digs deep into his Atlanta Hip Hop lineage, crafting an album that's equal parts rare in this climate (seeing it follows an unfolding narrative) and refreshing, given its telling content". Sam Moore from NME stated, "Father of 4 is a fine body of work that builds a convincing case that Offset is currently best-placed to be Migos' break-out solo star: once again, the final act of a trilogy proves to be the finest". Exclaim! critic Kyle Mullin said, "Sure, some of the dark and downtempo beats can begin to sound same-y by the time you're through. And Offset certainly hasn't attained the lyrical brilliance of Jay-Z on 4:44, or any of the other elder rapper's releases for that matter. Nevertheless, Offset's level of growth and candour on Father of 4 is that of an MC making leaps and bounds, both in his music and his personal life". Charles Holmes of Rolling Stone opined, "Predictably, Father of 4 falls prey to the bloat that characterizes most Migos' projects. ... Father of 4 is decidedly still a trap album, but it bucks the current conventions of the genre. Offset is attempting, often successfully, to showcase the humanity behind his frequently misguided choices – it's a piece of art that likely wouldn't exist if we didn't already know about some of his transgressions".

Stephen Kearse of Pitchfork said, "Father of 4 ultimately works as a solo outing because Offset is such a force of nature, but it's too often cautious where it could be candid, or dull where it should be sharp. Still, the record is a progression for Offset and for Migos". Reviewing the album for Entertainment Weekly, Brian Josephs stated: "Offset often sounds drained in a way that doesn't really invite empathy." Consequences Wren Graves wrote, "Offset splits his time between personal stories and generalized trapping, with mixed results. When he finds the right flow, few can match him for sheer musical joy. Other times he sound flat and stale. ... You have to respect the work ethic that produced these 16 tracks, even if many of them don't merit a second listen".

Commercial performance
Father of 4 debuted at number four on the US Billboard 200 with 89,000 album-equivalent units, including 7,000 pure album sales in its first week. It is Offset's second solo US top 10 album. In its second week, the album dropped to number nine on the chart, earning an additional 39,000 album-equivalent units that week. As of May 2019, the album has earned 282,000 album-equivalent units including 10,000 copies in pure album sales in the United States.

Track listing

Notes
  signifies an additional producer

Sample credits
 "North Star" contains an interpolation from "Save a Prayer", written by Simon Le Bon, Andy Taylor, John Taylor, Roger Taylor, and Nick Rhodes, as performed by Duran Duran.

Personnel
Credits adapted from the album's liner notes and Tidal.

Musicians
 Peter Lee Johnson – strings 
 North Star Choir – choir 
 Brandon Whatley, Jonathan Coleman, Deidre Etheridge, Brandelyn Harris-Crumedy, Olivia King, Yolanda Stewart, Marcus Ross, Demetrius Banks, Brandi Jackson, Tiuanna Lemons
 G Koop – guitar 

Technical
 JRich ENT. – recording 
 Evan LaRay – recording 
 Ethan Stevens – recording , mixing 
 William "Bilz" Dougan – recording 
 DJ Durel – mixing 
 Thomas "Tillie" Mann – mixing , recording 
 Princeton "Perfect Harmony" Terry – mixing assistant 
 Colin Leonard – mastering

Charts

Weekly charts

Year-end charts

Certifications

References

2019 debut albums
Motown albums
Offset (rapper) albums
Quality Control Music albums
Albums produced by Metro Boomin
Albums produced by Southside (record producer)
Albums produced by Cubeatz
Albums produced by Zaytoven